The Pteroplistinae comprise a subfamily of crickets (currently unplaced in any family), in the superfamily Grylloidea.  Species are found in tropical Asia.

Genera and Species
 Asymmetriola Gorochov, 2010 - monotypic A. spinosa Gorochov, 2010
 Changiola Gorochov, 2004
 Changiola pahangi Gorochov, 2011
 Changiola perakensis (Chopard, 1969)
 Changiola subita Gorochov, 2004
 Crockeriola Gorochov & Kostia, 1999 - monotypic C. stolarczyki Gorochov & Kostia, 1999
 Kerinciola Gorochov, 2004
 Kerinciola similis (Chopard, 1969)
 Kerinciola sonora Gorochov, 2004
 Kerinciola tabulophila Gorochov, 2011
 Pangrangiola Gorochov, 2004
 Pangrangiola bona Gorochov, 2004
 Pangrangiola propria Gorochov, 2004
 Pteroplistes Brunner von Wattenwyl, 1873 (synonym Pteroplistus Saussure, 1877 in monotypic tribe  Pteroplistini)
 Pteroplistes acinaceus Saussure, 1877
 Pteroplistes borneoensis Gorochov, 2004
 Pteroplistes bruneiensis Tan, Gorochov & Wahab, 2019
 †Pteroplistes danicus Rust, 1999
 Pteroplistes kervasae Jaiswara, 2014
 Pteroplistes lagrecai Gorochov, 2004
 Pteroplistes malaccanus Gorochov, 2018
 Pteroplistes masinagudi Jaiswara, 2014
 Pteroplistes platycleis Bolívar, 1900
 Pteroplistes platyxiphus (Haan, 1844)
 Pteroplistes sumatranus Gorochov, 2004
 Singapuriola Gorochov & Tan, 2012 - monotypic S. separata Gorochov & Tan, 2012
 Tembelingiola Gorochov, 2004 - monotypic T. plana Gorochov, 2004
 Tramlapiola Gorochov, 1990
 Tramlapiola bugiamap Gorochov, 2018
 Tramlapiola sylvestris Gorochov, 1990

References

External links
 Tan MK, Wahab RHA (2018): images of Pteroplistinae, Podoscirtinae and Trigonidiinae from Brunei Darussalam, Borneo (retrieved 3 February 2019)
 

Orthoptera subfamilies
Orthoptera of Asia
Crickets